Adam Fantilli (born October 12, 2004) is a Canadian college ice hockey player for the University of Michigan of the National Collegiate Athletic Association (NCAA). He is considered a top prospect for the 2023 NHL Entry Draft.

Playing career
Fantilli was drafted in the first round, 18th overall, by the Saginaw Spirit in the 2020 OHL Priority Selection Draft. He was considered the top Canadian prospect in the draft, however, he had already committed to play for the Chicago Steel. On September 13, 2021, the Spirit exercised their defected player rule and traded Fantilli's OHL playing rights to the North Bay Battalion. Saginaw received a first-round pick, 19th overall, in the 2022 draft, one spot after the player was originally drafted, as compensation for the player failing to report to the team. They will also receive four conditional picks if Fantilli ever plays in the OHL.

Fantilli attended Kimball Union Academy where he recorded 18 goals and 18 assists in 25 games. On March 25, 2020, Fantilli signed a USHL tender agreement with the Chicago Steel for the 2020–21 season. During the regular season he recorded 18 goals and 18 assists in 49 games for the Steel and was named to the USHL All-Rookie Second Team. During the Clark Cup playoffs, he recorded eight goals and one assist in eight games to help lead his team to the Anderson Cup and Clark Cup. He was subsequently named the Clark Cup Playoffs MVP. During the 2021–22 season, he led the team in scoring and recorded 37 goals and 37 assists in 54 games. His 37 goals were the second-most in a single season in program history. His 74 points tied him with Kyle Connor for the most points by a player in their draft-minus-one season in USHL history. Following the season he was named to the All-USHL First Team.

In August 2021, Fantilli verbally committed to the University of Michigan. He began his collegiate career for the Michigan Wolverines during the 2022–23 season. He made his debut for Michigan on October 7, 2022, in a game against Lindenwood, where he won 15 of 19 faceoffs and recorded two assists. The next day, he scored his first career collegiate goal in a victory over Lindenwood. On October 21, he scored his first career hat-trick in a game against Lake Superior State. The next day, he scored a career-high four points with one goal and three assists, in a victory over Lake Superior State. He was subsequently named the Big Ten First Star of the Week for the week ending October 24, after he recorded seven points during the weekend series. With 15 points over his first six games, he recorded the best start in program history since Bruno Baseotto had 19 points in his first six games in 1979. He was named the Hockey Commissioners Association Men's Player of the Month and Rookie of the Month for the month of October. In eight games, he recorded eight goals and 10 assists for 18 points. He recorded at least one point in every game. He was named the Hockey Commissioners Association Men's Player of the Month for the month of January. In six games, he recorded five goals and nine assists for 14 points, and led the NCAA with 2.33 points per game. On February 24, 2023, Fantilli recorded his 50th point of the season, becoming the first player in the nation to reach the milestone. He became the first Wolverine player to record 50 points in a season since Cooper Marody had 51 points during the 2017–18 season. During the regular season he recorded 11 goals and 19 assists in 19 conference games for a league-best 1.58 points per game. Following an outstanding season, he was named to the All-Big Ten Freshman Team, the All-Big Ten First Team and was named Big Ten Freshman of the Year. During the 2023 Big Ten men's ice hockey tournament he set the Big Ten tournament record for goals in a single tournament with seven and in points with 11. He was subsequently named the Big Ten Tournament MVP.

International play

 

Fantilli represented Canada at the 2020 Winter Youth Olympics where he served as alternate captain. During the tournament he recorded two goals and one assist in four games and won a bronze medal.

Fantilli represented Canada at the 2022 IIHF World U18 Championships, where he served as alternate captain and recorded one goal and five assists in four games

On December 12, 2022, Fantilli was named to Canada men's national junior ice hockey team to compete at the 2023 World Junior Ice Hockey Championships. During the tournament he recorded two goals and three assists in seven games and won a gold medal.

Personal life
Fantilli is the son of Giuliano and Julia Fantilli. His brother, Luca, also plays college ice hockey at Michigan.

Career statistics

Regular season and playoffs

International

Awards and honors

References

External links

2004 births
Living people
Canadian ice hockey forwards
Canadian expatriate ice hockey players in the United States
Canadian people of Italian descent
Chicago Steel players
Michigan Wolverines men's ice hockey players
Ice hockey players at the 2020 Winter Youth Olympics
Youth Olympic bronze medalists for Canada